Mohamad Nabih Halawi (born 5 April 1977) is a Lebanese former footballer who played as a centre-back.

Halawi spent nine seasons with Nejmeh, before moving to Ahed in 2007. Two years later, he joined Shabab Al Sahel FC, before playing for Mabarra in the Lebanese Second Division during the 2012–13 season, where he retired. Halawi has been capped 22 times for the Lebanon national team, scoring one goal. He represented them at the 2000 AFC Asian Cup, which Lebanon hosted.

Honours
Ahed
 Lebanese Super Cup: 2008

Individual
 Lebanese Premier League Team of the Season: 1999–2000, 2000–01, 2003–04, 2004–05, 2008–09

References

External links
 

1977 births
Living people
Footballers from Beirut
Lebanese footballers
Association football defenders
Lebanon international footballers
Lebanese Premier League players
Nejmeh SC players
Al Ahed FC players
Shabab Al Sahel FC players
Al Mabarra Club players
2000 AFC Asian Cup players